is a Japanese manga series written and illustrated by Ryou Minenami. It was serialized in Shogakukan's Weekly Shōnen Sunday from October 2015 to March 2019.

Plot 
The manga revolves around Tarou Kurume, a boy who is not interested in love. One day, he is hit on the head by a baseball during a P.E. class, leaving him with a severe concussion. When he wakes up at the infirmary, he is welcomed by a pink-haired, cheerful, well-endowed and scantily clad girl who's seemingly floating in the air. Not only that, he starts to see similar "ghosts" around countless boys, and finds out that they are fantasized versions of the first girl they loved, with the floating zombie above Tarou representing his first love.

Characters 

A 15-year-old boy who is childhood friends with Mei Ebino. Tarou believes in "energy-saving" and initially has no interest in love-related matters.

Tarou's first love zombie. Unlike most other zombies, Eve is self-aware and able to interact with her owner. She often appears floating above Tarou's head wearing sparkly flowing pink hair with a hair accessory, and a white high school girl uniform.

Tarou's first love, from when they were in the same English class ten years ago.

Tarou's childhood friend and neighbor, she attends the same school as him and is responsible for the injury that begins all of Tarou's troubles.

Manga 
Hatsukoi Zombie is written and illustrated by Ryou Minenami. It was serialized in Shogakukan's shōnen manga magazine Weekly Shōnen Sunday from October 14, 2015 to March 27, 2019. The series was collected into seventeen tankōbon volumes published by Shogakukan, from March 18, 2016 to June 18, 2019.

Volume list

See also
Boy's Abyss, another manga series by the same author

References

External links 
 Official website at Web Sunday (in Japanese)
 Official Shogakukan manga website (in Japanese)

Cross-dressing in anime and manga
Romantic comedy anime and manga
Shogakukan manga
Shōnen manga